Kurt Raab (20 July 1941 – 28 June 1988) was a West German stage and film actor, as well as a screenwriter and playwright. Raab is best remembered for his work with German film director Rainer Werner Fassbinder, with whom he collaborated on 31 film projects.

Biography
Raab was born in Bergreichenstein, which is now Kašperské Hory, Czech Republic. He completed the abitur at Musische Gymnasium Straubing, and studied in Munich.

He made his cinema debut in Fassbinder's Liebe ist kälter als der Tod (Love Is Colder than Death) in 1969.  Over the next few years, he made numerous films with Fassbinder, including Warum läuft Herr R. Amok? (Why Does Herr R. Run Amok?) and Der Amerikanische Soldat (The American Soldier) in 1970, Warnung vor einer heiligen Nutte (Beware of a Holy Whore) in 1971, and Der Händler der vier Jahreszeiten (The Merchant of Four Seasons) in 1972.

He also worked as a production designer, assistant director, producer, and a screenwriter.

Raab was friends with Freddie Mercury of Queen, and appears as a ballerina in the band's music video for It's a Hard Life. He is also seen in Mercury's Living on My Own video, dressed in drag as Mary, Queen of Scots.

On 28 June 1988, at age 46, Raab died of AIDS-related complications. Before Raab died, he worked to raise awareness about HIV/AIDS in Germany. In 1987, he discussed his illness in Herbert Achternbusch's Wohin?, a film about AIDS hysteria. In 1988, he made Mitten im Leben, a documentary about AIDS, for Zweites Deutsches Fernsehen.
However, the illness remained poorly understood and Raab was placed in quarantine-like conditions in the Hamburg Tropical Institute. While confined to a hospital bed, Raab and his friend Hans Hirschmüller compiled the documentary Sehnsucht Nach Sodom, in which they explored "subjects as taboo as AIDS, death and the Catholicism of a gay person." Sehnsucht was released posthumously in 1989.

Prejudice about AIDS was also evident when Raab's body was refused burial in Steinbeißen, the Lower Bavarian town in which his family had settled in 1945. He is buried in Ohlsdorf Cemetery in Hamburg.

Filmography

References

External links
 
 Kurt Raab at Allmovie

1941 births
1988 deaths
People from Kašperské Hory
People from Sudetenland
Sudeten German people
AIDS-related deaths in Germany
German male stage actors
German male film actors
German male television actors
German autobiographers
20th-century German male actors
German male non-fiction writers